FK Gaber Vatasha is a football club from the village of Vatasha, Kavadarci, Republic of Macedonia. They currently play in Macedonian Third League (South Division), and they play their home matches at Kalnica stadium in Vatasha.

History
The club was founded in 1962.

Their best achievement was competing in the Macedonian Second League in 1996-97, 1997-98 and 1998-99.

References

External links
 
Club info at MacedonianFootball 
Football Federation of Macedonia 

Football clubs in North Macedonia
Association football clubs established in 1962
Kavadarci Municipality